Tonči Peribonio (born 3 May 1960) is a Croatian former handball goalkeeper. He is currently a goalkeeper coach at TSG Ketsch.

Career
Peribonio started his career at RK Krivaja Zavidovići. After nine years at the club he moved to RK Zamet and helped them get promoted to the Yugoslav First League. During 1991 Peribonio moved from Zamet to Spanish club Gáldar Tres de Mayo where he spent a season before moving to RK Zagreb.

In 1997 Peribonio moved to Split Brodomerkur where he spent two seasons as captain before moving to Germany. He played in the EHF Cup with the club in 1997-98 and 1998-99.

Honours
RK Zamet
Yugoslav Second League (north) (1): 1986-87

RK Zagreb Loto/Banka/Badel 1862
Croatian First A League (2): 1992-93, 1993–94 
Croatian Cup (2): 1993, 1994
European Champions Cup (1): 1992-93
European Super Cup (1): 1993

Solin Transportcommerce
Croatian First B League (1): 1996-97

Orders
Order of Danica Hrvatska with face of Franjo Bučar - 1995

References

1960 births
Living people
RK Zamet players
Croatian male handball players
RK Krivaja Zavidovići players
RK Zagreb players
Sportspeople from Slavonski Brod
Croatian expatriate sportspeople in Germany
Mediterranean Games gold medalists for Croatia
Competitors at the 1993 Mediterranean Games
Mediterranean Games medalists in handball
20th-century Croatian people